Prunum cassis is a species of sea snail, a marine gastropod mollusc in the family Marginellidae.

Description

Distribution
P. cassis can be found in Caribbean waters, ranging from western Florida to Cuba.

References

Marginellidae
Gastropods described in 1889